Wayne Bentley Phillips (born 1 March 1958) is a former Australian cricketer who played in 27 Test matches and 48 One Day Internationals (ODIs) between 1982 and 1986 as a batsman and wicket-keeper. He played for South Australia between 1978 and 1991

Early career
Phillips played cricket as a wicketkeeper at high school, but concentrated on batting once he started grade cricket with Sturt district cricket club. He would occasionally keep wicket and was a reserve wicketkeeper with Australian under-age teams, but soon established himself as a specialist batsman.

He made his first class debut during the 1977–78 season, when the state sides had been depleted due to World Series Cricket. Over the summer he played three Sheffield Shield matches and a single one-day match as a middle-order batsman, with a top score of 22.

Phillips did not play first class cricket again until the 1980–81 season, when he was picked for South Australia's last match of the Sheffield Shield. He made the most of his opportunity, scoring 111 and 91 as an opener against Victoria.

Phillips established himself as an opening batsman over the 1981–82 season, scoring 857 first class runs at an average of 47.61, forming a strong opening combination with Rick Darling and making an important contribution to South Australia winning the Sheffield Shield that summer.

He scored a century against the visiting Pakistan side and 260 against Queensland – the first double century from a South Australian batsman in ten years.

These results saw Phillips selected in the Australian squad to tour Pakistan that winter as a batsman and reserve keeper.

There was a spot open in the Australian batting line up as Greg Chappell was not touring. Phillips was in competition with Greg Ritchie.

A score of 92 in a tour game against the Pakistan Invitation XI saw Phillips selected to make his one-day international debut in the final match of that series. Unfortunately the game was called off due to a riot.

Phillips scored consistently throughout the 1982–83 season, scoring 680 runs at an average of 37.77. He made centuries against New South Wales and Tasmania. Graeme Wood was dropped as opener after the first test, but his spot was given to Kepler Wessels, a South African batsman who had been in excellent form for Queensland for several seasons and only just become eligible for Australian selection.

Nonetheless, Phillips remained on the radar of Australian selectors. He was picked as 12th man for the 3rd test, and selected in a Young Australian side to tour Zimbabwe in early 1983 as a wicketkeeper batsman. The highlight of this tour for Phillips was scoring 135 in a one-day game. After this success, commentators started talking about Phillips as a possible Australian wicketkeeper.

Test Batsman
Phillips became the 1983–84 summer superbly with 234 against Tasmania and 75 against the touring Pakistan side. He was selected as opener in Australia's side for the first test against Pakistan, replacing John Dyson and partnering Kepler Wessels. Phillips had an excellent debut, scoring 159 in the first innings and helping set up a huge Australian victory; he also took three catches.

He captained South Australia in a game against Queensland, scoring 14. In the rain-shortened second test, Phillips scored 46.  He made 1 and 21 for South Australia against WA, then made 12 and 54 in the third test; his second innings half century helped Australia secure a draw. Phillips made 5 and 36 against NSW in a Shielf game, then he scored 35 in the fourth test and 37 and 19 not out in the fifth; Phillips had made 362 runs in the series at an average of 60.33.

During the summer Phillips was also picked as wicketkeeper for some one day games for South Australia, which led to further calls for Rod Marsh to be dropped and replaced as keeper by Phillips. When Marsh scored a half century in an ODI he raised his bat in the direction of the press box.

Wicket-keeper
Rod Marsh had retired as Australia's wicketkeeper at the end of the 1983–84 season and it was expected his replacement would be Roger Woolley, who kept wicket for the first two tour games. Phillips played as a specialist batsman in these games – in the first, against Leeward Islands, he made 27 and 23 (off 109 balls) although he and Wessels put on 114 together. In the second, against Guyana, Phillips made 1 and 62. During the Leeward Island game, Phillips and Greg Ritchie were reprimanded for arriving 75 minutes late on day two.

In the first ODI, Phillips was picked as wicketkeeper and batted at seven Steve Smith, played as opener; Smith scored a 60 in that game, and that fact, on top of Smith scoring twin centuries in the Guyana game, led to discussion that Phillips would be dropped for Smith in the first test.

However, Woolley had a chipped bone in his right index finger and the selectors felt having Phillips as keeper would strengthen Australia's batting. "We couldn't risk a keeper who was not 100% sure of his fitness," said Hughes. This allowed them to pick Smith as opener to bat alongside Kepler Wessels. Phillips had only kept in four first-class games beforehand. Accordingly, Phillips played the first test batting at number seven, top scoring in Australia's second innings with 76 (he made 16 in the first innings). This innings helped save Australia from defeat. Ian Chappell wrote that Phillips "should now spend every spare moment he has improving his wicketkeeping" and suggested "a toughening in Wayne's attitude as he is a likeable, easy going bloke who basically wouldn't want to put anyone's nose out of joint, never mind a job." Chappell thought Phillips should endeavour to be like Jeff Dujon, who started as a batsman then became a keeper. "Who knows," wrote Chappell, "with plenty of hard work and a touch of aggressive thinking... he might become another Rod Marsh."

Phillips was picked as a specialist middle order batsman in the notorious tour match against Trinidad and Tobago, while Wooley kept and Smith opened. Phillips made 19 and 12 not out, being at the wicket in the second innings during Kim Hughes' "protest" against the local side, where he instructed batsmen to score slowly. At one point Phillips took off his pads and lay down on the field during the game. Phillips played in the second ODI as wicketkeeper, scoring 10 runs in what was a rare Australian victory on the tour.

After Steve Smith fell ill and was unable to play in the second test, Phillips was promoted to opener (Dean Jones replaced Smith but batted down the order), but failed in two innings, scoring 4 and 0. Phillips played as a specialist middle order batsman in a tour game against Barbados, making 21 and 52 not out.

Smith recovered for the third test so Phillips was put back down the order again, this time at number eight, with Tom Hogan batting ahead of him. The move seemed to pay off in the first innings, Phillips scoring 120 runs, including 14 fours and 4 sixes, helping Australia to a competitive total of 429. However Australia collapsed disastrously in the second innings for 91 (Phillips 1) and Australia lost by ten wickets.

By the 4th test openers Graeme Wood and Kepler Wessells were injured so Phillips had to open. Kim Hughes felt that Phillips could not keep as well so Woolley was recalled as a keeper and Phillips played as a specialist batsman (opening with Greg Ritchie); he only scored 5 and 22 and Australia lost by an innings and 30 runs.

In the 3rd ODI, Phillips was a keeper and opener, scoring 0. He made 64 as an opener/keeper in a tour game against Jamaica, but only 13 in the 4th ODI. Woolley's form had been poor and Phillips was back at behind the stumps for the 5th test, opening both innings as well, making only 12 and 2.

Peter McFarline who covered the tour later said Roger "Woolley's tour with the gloves has been as poor as I have seen in this class of cricket. It resulted in Wayne Phillips, a man of talent but not yet with the capacity to understand that talent, being placed in the position of keeping as well as opening the batting." McFarline argued the tour "showed conclusively that he is not an opening batsman of standing in this class" and felt his "future lies at six or seven in the order. He needs to be given the keeping job for his state in order to make the improvement necessary to do the job for Australia in the future."

Ian Chappell wrote towards the end of the tour that "there is not a top class keeper in Australia at the moment and therefore Wayne Phillips has the chance to take the spot on the strength of his batting" but added that "If Phillips is to hold his position there (and his chances) he must be prepared to get a lot of bruises on his hands while practising his keeping."

However, when Phillips returned to Australia he was told South Australia would persist with Kevin Wright as keeper and Phillips could only keep wicket in one day games. In response, Phillips said he would move to Western Australia. The South Australian selectors then reversed their decision and told Phillips he had a guaranteed selection to keep for the first three games. This led to Wright retiring from first class cricket.

Phillips stayed on as first choice wicketkeeper for the 1984 tour of India. He was quoted at the time saying:
From the Australian point of view, I can become the all-rounder. I don't bat and bowl but I bat and wicket-keep... Hopefully this tour will see the start of me becoming a specialist wicket-keeper. I realise I'm under enormous pressure, but I really believe I can prove I am as good as any specialist wicket-keeper in the country.
Phillips was generally held to have done a good job on the tour and also throughout the 1984–85 summer, despite an injury which saw him miss several games.

In the first test against the West Indies he made 22 (Australia's top score) and 16. In the second he made 44 (again Australia's top score) and 54. He was one of the few batsmen seen to be taking on the West Indies bowling.

Phillips dislocated a finger and missed the last three tests. He was replaced by Steve Rixon but resumed his position at the end of the summer when he was better.

He was also selected on the 1985 Ashes.

At the end of the summer it was revealed that in November 1984 Phillips had signed to go on the rebel tours to South Africa over the 1985–86 and 1986–87 seasons. The tours were organised by former test batsman, Bruce Francis, who later wrote that Phillips:
Disliked keeping and would have preferred to play for Australia as a top-order batsman. By the time the tour was being put together, he had become fed up with the pressures of the modern game and was determined to make as much money as he could, as quickly as he could, and then retire. It was a revelation to me that such a fine player could be so unenthusiastic about the game.
However Phillips, along with Dirk Wellham and Graeme Wood, changed his mind after a financial inducement from Kerry Packer. (Murray Bennett changed his mind of his own accord.) For a time it was unsure whether the rest of the Australian players would agree to tour with Wellham, Phillips and Wood, but this was cleared up and the players were allowed to go to England.

Phillips was one of the few Australian players to return home with his reputation enhanced during the 1985 Ashes tour, which Australia lost 3–1. An innings of 91 in the first Test came close to saving the game for Australia, and in the second he made 21 in the first innings and came to the wicket in the second when Australia were 5/65 chasing 127 runs to win. He scored 29 in a partnership of 51 runs with Allan Border, taking Australia in sight of victory.

A score of 2 in the third Test was followed by scores of 36 and 39 not out in the fourth - the latter innings helping secure a draw - and in the fifth Test, an innings of 59 brought Australia to within 80 minutes of a draw before he was dismissed in controversial circumstances.

According to one writer, Phillips, Border and Ritchie were the only Australian batsmen to perform well. "Phillips made few mistakes behind the stumps for a wicketkeeper derided as "a batsman with gloves". And his thrilling square cut was reminiscent of the great Ted Dexter at the height of his power."

Final International Summer
Phillips was kept on as Australia's wicketkeeper for the following summer against New Zealand and India. At the beginning of the season, Mike Coward wrote that "there cannot be any question about Wayne Phillips being named wicketkeeper. After all, arguably, he is the second-best batsman in the Australian team."

In an early Shield game against WA, he dropped several catches and made a number of fumbles.

In the first test he scored 34 and 2.

In the second test Phillips was back as opener as well as keeper in the wake of Kepler Wessels leaving the team. He scored 31 in the first innings (as opener) and 63 in the second, laying the platform for a successful chase.

However his form behind the stumps against the spinners was increasingly poor, and caused a drop in his confidence which in turn affected his batting.

In the third test against New Zealand (again opening) he scored 37 and 10.

He opened in the first test against India scoring 11.

In the second test against India he missed two easy stumpings, causing Alan Border to come to his defence: "I feel sorry for Wayne", he said. "He's had a couple of bad tracks to keep on. He feels he is letting down the side. But I hope we stick with him. I don't believe there is a 'keeper in the country capable of doing any better." He opened in the first innings scoring 7, then was put down the order for the second, making 13.

Prime Minister Bob Hawke even weighed in on the issue:
We've got to have a specialist wicketkeeper and I don't mean that as any reflection on Wayne Phillips. I think an unfair burden has been placed on him. What we need to see is Australia's best keeper chosen and I think we'll see Phillips in there as a batsman and we'll get much more value from his batting when he's been relieved of that burden.

Border said Phillips "isn't enjoying things and blames himself for letting the boys down. But practically everyone in the side has gone to him and expressed their confidence."

In the third test he made 14 and 22.

He had better luck in some ODIs scoring a crucial 28 in one win.

Phillips ended up being replaced by specialist keeper Tim Zoehrer on the 1986 tour to New Zealand. Cricket journalist Mike Coward wrote at the time that "Phillips, who has been the butt of much criticism and ridicule over the past 12 months... who has been severely depressed at times this season, will privately rejoice at Zoehrer's promotion".

Phillips also missed a one-day game that season due to a cracked bone in his finger.

Phillips played in all three tests of the 1986 tour of New Zealand as a specialist batsman, although he also played as wicketkeeper in the one day internationals, and one of the tour games. By now David Boon and Geoff Marsh had established themselves as openers, so Phillips batted at number three.

He made 32 in the first test. "I haven't made up my mind absolutely on Phillips," said Border, "but he is more relaxed and enjoying his cricket more than before."

He made 1 and 25 in the second and 62 and 15 in the third (taking over wicketkeeping when Zoehrer was injured).

He only passed 50 once in the tests, the third game which Australia lost after a second innings collapse. This turned out to be Phillip's last test.

He did play one last great innings for Australia, helping win the 3rd one day international. He came to the wicket with Australia at 5–142 requiring 230 to win and Steve Waugh at the other end. Waugh asked him what he thought and Phillips replied, "Simple, young fella. With my talent and your youth, we'll get these with an over to spare." The two of them put on 86 runs with Phillips scoring 53 off 32 balls, and Australia won by 3 wickets. Phillips and Waugh were voted joint man of the match.

Journalist Trevor Grant, who covered the game, wrote that
Anyone who has followed the career of the South Australian left-hander and former wicketkeeper knows his capacity to turn a game. But his form has reached such a low point on this tour that it was illogical to believe he could do it at this stage of a long, demanding and utterly forgettable season. But all the exasperating uncertainty was suddenly cast aside today.

Phillips was picked on the tour of Sharjah. However he was not selected in the squad to tour India later that year and never regained his position in the Australian Test or one day side.

When asked about his omission, Phillips replied that he was "going to do what he wanted to do and not going to be at the beck and call of these idiots who pick the side. He expressed his regret the next day  but was fined $2,000 by the Australian Cricket Board.

Post Test career
Philips went on to score runs for South Australia until the early 1990s.  He concentrated on batting although he occasionally returned to wicketkeeping.

In March 1987, he batted in partnership of 462 runs with David Hookes against Tasmania, setting an Australian record for the highest first run partnership. Phillips scored 213 not out. The runs were scored in 299 minutes off only 84.3 overs He also scored a century against the visiting English side. Despite this, he was not recalled to the national side.

In 1988–89 he scored 129 runs at 18 for South Australia and was dropped to make way for Darren Lehmann.

In 1989–90 he captained Sturt to the Adelaide District Championship.

In 1990–91 he was recalled to the South Australian side after two seasons. He played for South Australia in one dayers as a wicketkeeper.

Assessment
Phillip's promotion to wicketkeeper is generally held to have done considerable damage to his talents as a batsman. Steve Waugh later described him as:
That sporadic genuius... 'Flipper' was always upbeat and great fun to be around – except when he was driving the team bus, in a style that on occasions bordered on maniacal and broke most of the known road rules – but I could never quite work out whether his casual, laid-back attitude was genuine or a disguise for uncertainty and self-doubt.
At his peak, his good looks and ability to score fast meant he was one of the most popular Australian players, particularly with Channel Nine (who broadcast the game) and PBL (in change of marketing). Graham Halbish, an executive with the Australian Cricket Board, later wrote that:
Wayne was very popular with Channel Nine and PBL because they believed he was good value as a commercial asset. PBL rated him in the top three or so players in the country. The selectors certainly did not have him rated that highly. He was a wicketkeeper and a batsman but he was not performing to an exceptional standard, or consistently. Statistics did not equate to his profile.

Phillips still holds the Test match records for the most matches played (18) and catches taken (43) in a complete career without a stumping.

Coaching
He coached the Southern Redbacks for four seasons, until resigning on 16 March 2007, one season before his contract was set to expire.

Post Cricket career
In 2007 Phillips accepted a position as chief fundraiser for the South Australian branch of the Liberal Party.

Family
Philiips' father Brian Phillips was a former Australian rules footballer and chairman of selectors with Sturt Football Club in the South Australian National Football League.

References

Waugh, Steve, Out of My Comfort Zone, Penguin, 2006

External links
 

1958 births
Living people
Australia One Day International cricketers
Australia Test cricketers
South Australia cricketers
Cricketers who made a century on Test debut
Australian cricketers
Cricketers from Adelaide
Australian cricket coaches
Wicket-keepers